This is a discography of South African musician Miriam Makeba (1953-2008).

Studio albums
 Miriam Makeba (1960) (LP RCA Victor LPM/LSP-2267)
 The Many Voices of Miriam Makeba (1962) (LP Kapp KL1274)
 The World of Miriam Makeba (1963) (LP RCA Victor LPM/LSP-2750) #86 (US)
 The Voice of Africa (1964) (LP RCA Victor LPM/LSP-2845) #122 (US)
 Makeba Sings! (1965) (LP RCA Victor LPM/LSP-3321)
 An Evening with Belafonte/Makeba (1965) (LP with Harry Belafonte; RCA Victor LPM/LSP-3420; Grammy Award for Best Ethnic or Traditional Folk Recording) #85 (US)
 The Magic of Makeba (1965) (LP RCA Victor LPM/LSP-3512)
 The Magnificent Miriam Makeba (1966) (LP Mercury 134016)
 All About Miriam (1966) (LP Mercury 134029)
 Pata Pata (1967) (LP Reprise RS6274) #74 (US)
 Makeba! (1968) (LP Reprise RS6310)
 Keep Me in Mind (1970) (LP Reprise RS6381)
 A Promise (1974) (LP RCA YSPL1-544)
 Miriam Makeba & Bongi (1975) (LP with Bongi Makeba; Guinea: Editions Syliphone Conakry SLP 48)
 Country Girl (1978) (LP Sonodisc ESP165518)
 Comme une symphonie d'amour (1979) (LP Sonodisc ESP 7501)
 Sangoma (1988) (CD Warner Bros. 25673)
 Welela (1989) (CD Gallo CDGSP3084) #6 (US World Music Albums)
 Eyes on Tomorrow (1991) (CD Gallo CDGSP3086) #10 (US World Music Albums)
 Sing Me a Song (1993) (CD CDS12702)
 Homeland (2000) (CD Putumayo PUTU1642)
 Reflections (2004) (CD Gallo Music GWVCD-51) #12 (US World Music Albums)
 Forever (2006) (CD Gallo Music CDGURB-082) - compilation

Live albums
 Miriam Makeba in Concert! (1967) (LP) (Reprise RS6253) #182 (US)
 Live in Tokyo (1968) (LP) (Reprise SJET8082)
 Live in Conakry: Appel a l'Afrique (1974) (LP) (Sonodisc SLP22)
 Enregistrement public au Theatre des Champs-Elysées (1977) (LP) (released on CD6508 as Pata Pata: Live in Paris in 1998)
 Live at Berns Salonger, Stockholm, Sweden, 1966 (2003) (CD and DVD) (Gallo Music GWVCD-49)

Compilations
 The Best of Miriam Makeba (LP) Canada: RCA Victor LSP-3982, 1968
 Harry Belafonte and Miriam Makeba (2xLP) RCA International (Camden) PJL2-8042, 1975
 Miriam Makeba (LP) Italy: Record Bazaar RB 254, 1980
 The Queen of African Music (CD) Verlag Pläne 831 655–938, 1987
 Africa (CD) Germany: Novus 3155-2-N/ND 83155, 1991
 Miriam Makeba and The Skylarks: Volume 1 (as Miriam Makeba and The Skylarks; Remastered from 78/45 RPM recorded between 1956 and 1959) (CD) TELCD 2303, 1991
 Folk Songs from Africa (CD) SAAR CD 12514, 1994
 En public à Paris et Conakry (CD), 1996
 Hits and Highlights (CD), 1997
 Miriam Makeba and The Skylarks: Volume 2 (as Miriam Makeba and The Skylarks; Remastered from 78/45 RPM recorded between 1956 and 1959) (CD) TELCD 2315, 1997
 The Best of Miriam Makeba (CD) BMG/RCA, 2000
 Legend (CD) Next Music CDSL21, 2001
 Mama Africa: The Very Best of Miriam Makeba (CD), 2001
 The Guinea Years (CD/LP) STCD3017/SLP48, 2001
 Mother Africa: The Black Anthology (CD), 2002
 The Best of Miriam Makeba: The Early Years (CD) Wrasse WRASS 088, 2002
 The Definitive Collection (CD) UK: Wrasse WRASS 062, 2002
 Her Essential Recordings (2xCD) Manteca MANTDBL502, 2006
 Mama Afrika 1932–2008 (CD) Gallo, 2009

Extended plays
 Makeba – Belafonte (as Miriam Makeba and Harry Belafonte) (Vinyl, 7", 45 RPM) Germany: RCA Victor EPA 9035, 1961
 The Click Song (Vinyl, 7", EP) France: London RE 10.145, 1963
 Chants d'Afrique (Vinyl, 7") France: RCA Victor 86.374, 1964

Singles
 "Duze" (1956) (10-inch shellac 78 rpm mono Gallotone GB.2062)
 "Pass Office Special" (1957) (10-inch shellac 78 rpm mono Gallotone GB.2134)
 "The Click Song" / "Mbube" (1963) (7-inch vinyl London HL 9747)
 "Malaika" / "Malcolm X" (1965) (7-inch vinyl Kenya: Sonafric SYL 565)
 "Pata Pata" (1967) (7-inch vinyl Reprise 0606) #12 (US)	
 "Malayisha" (1967) (7-inch vinyl Reprise)
 "What is Love" (1968)
 "Emavungwini" (1968) (7-inch vinyl France, Spain: Reprise)
 "I Shall Be Released" / "Iphi Ndilela (Show Me the Way)" (1969) (7-inch vinyl Germany: Reprise RA 0804)
 "Pata Pata" / "Click Song Number 1" (1972) (7-inch vinyl Germany, Netherlands: Reprise REP 14 217)
 "We Got to Make It" / "Promise" (1975) 7-inch vinyl with Instrumentalgruppe German Democratic Republic: AMIGA 4 56 044, 1974, and France: Disques Espérance
 "Pata Pata" / "Malayisha" (1976) (7-inch vinyl Italy: Reprise 14 267, released in France in 1978)
 "Hauteng" / "Talking and Dialoging" (1978) (7-inch vinyl France: Disques Espérance ESP 155027)
 "Comme une symphonie d'amour" (1979) (7-inch vinyl France: Disques Espérance ESP 65.009)
 "Give Me a Reason" / "Africa" (1989) (7-inch vinyl Italy: Philips 875 308-7)
 "Pata Pata 2000" (2000) (CD Putumayo PUTU 919-S)

References

Miriam Makeba albums
Miriam Makeba songs
M